Alphesiboea (Ancient Greek: Ἀλφεσιβοίας) was the name of several characters in Greek mythology:

Alphesiboea, mother of Adonis with Phoenix.
Alphesiboea, a Psophian princess as the daughter of King Phegeus in Arcadia. She was the sister of Axion and Temenus, and married Alcmaeon who was purified by her father for the murder of his mother Eriphyle. Alphesiboea was deserted by her husband for the love of Callirhoe, daughter of the river-god Achelous. In revenge, her brothers Axion and Temenus at the command of their father treacherously slew their brother-in-law. Phegeus was also said to have murdered Alcmaeon himself and also Alphesiboea's unnamed daughter. Later on, the widowed sister, Alphesiboea killed her own brothers in revenge of her husbands's death. In some versions of this myth, she is called Arsinoe.
Alphesiboea, a daughter of Bias and Pero, and sister to Aretus and Perialkes. She was the wife of Pelias. This character, however, is usually called Anaxibia or other sources had Phylomache, Minyan daughter of King Amphion of Orchomenus as the spouse of Pelias.
Alphesiboea, an Indian nymph, who was obsessively coveted by Dionysus, but she refused to yield to his wishes, that is until the god changed himself into a tiger, and thus compelled her by fear of threat to allow him to carry her across the river Sollax, which from this circumstance received the name of Tigris. With him, she eventually became mother of Medes.

Notes

References 

 Apollodorus, The Library with an English Translation by Sir James George Frazer, F.B.A., F.R.S. in 2 Volumes, Cambridge, MA, Harvard University Press; London, William Heinemann Ltd. 1921. ISBN 0-674-99135-4. Online version at the Perseus Digital Library. Greek text available from the same website.
Gaius Julius Hyginus, Fabulae from The Myths of Hyginus translated and edited by Mary Grant. University of Kansas Publications in Humanistic Studies. Online version at the Topos Text Project.
 Gantz, Timothy, Early Greek Myth: A Guide to Literary and Artistic Sources, Johns Hopkins University Press, 1996, Two volumes:  (Vol. 1),  (Vol. 2).
Lucius Mestrius Plutarchus, Morals translated from the Greek by several hands. Corrected and revised by William W. Goodwin, Ph.D. Boston. Little, Brown, and Company. Cambridge. Press of John Wilson and son. 1874. 5. Online version at the Perseus Digital Library.
 Pausanias, Description of Greece with an English translation by W.H.S. Jones, Litt.D., and H.A. Ormerod, M.A., in 4 Volumes. Cambridge, MA, Harvard University Press; London, William Heinemann Ltd. 1918. Online version at the Perseus Digital Library
 Pausanias, Graeciae Descriptio. 3 vols. Leipzig, Teubner. 1903.  Greek text available at the Perseus Digital Library.
 Sextus Propertius, Elegies from Charm. Vincent Katz. trans. Los Angeles. Sun & Moon Press. 1995. Online version at the Perseus Digital Library. Latin text available at the same website.
 Theocritus, Idylls from The Greek Bucolic Poets translated by Edmonds, J M. Loeb Classical Library Volume 28. Cambridge, MA. Harvard University Press. 1912. Online version at theoi.com
 Theocritus, Idylls edited by R. J. Cholmeley, M.A. London. George Bell & Sons. 1901. Greek text available at the Perseus Digital Library.

Phoenician characters in Greek mythology
Nymphs
Princesses in Greek mythology
Queens in Greek mythology
Arcadian mythology
Thessalian mythology
Consorts of Dionysus
Family of Adonis